Hyderguda is a major locality in Hyderabad, Telangana, India. It is one of the costliest areas with high real estate cost both for commercial and residential properties.

The old MLA residential quarters are situated here.

Commercial area
Hyderguda has many malls and shopping areas. There is Food World, Pantaloons, More, etc. It has one of the biggest ICICI Bank branches located here. Corporation Bank also has a branch at Hyderguda.

There is a popular bakery King and Cardinal popular for its burgers etc.

The popular Hyderabadi restaurant, Bahar is located here. The Hyderabad Business Centre is also located here.

Bharatiya Vidya Bhavan has a branch here. St Joseph's Degree and PG College and St Paul's High School, Hyderabad also are located close to this Bhavan.Lotus National School is present here

Here Madina High School as well as Madina Students' Hostel were very popular in mid 1990s. Now the latter has been converted to Madina Eye Hospital.

Bata has an outlet at Hyderguda.

Transport
TSRTC runs the buses connecting Hyderguda to many prominent places such as Osmania University, Nampally, Kachiguda, etc.

The closest MMTS Train station is at Nampally.

References

 HYDERGUDA - https://web.archive.org/web/20160304235830/http://hyderguda.com/

Neighbourhoods in Hyderabad, India